Kışla (literally "barracks" in Turkish) may refer to the following places in Turkey:
 Kışla, Çaycuma
 Kışla, Kazan

See also
Qishlaq
Qishlah